The Defense Distinguished Service Medal is a military decoration of the United States Department of Defense, which is presented to United States Armed Forces service members for exceptionally distinguished performance of duty contributing to the national security or defense of the United States. President Nixon awarded the first medal, on the day the Executive Order was signed, to General Earle Wheeler, who was retiring from the US Army after serving as Chief of Staff of the United States Army and then Chairman of the Joint Chiefs of Staff.

It is equivalent to the United States Department of Homeland Security's Homeland Security Distinguished Service Medal.

Criteria
The Defense Distinguished Service Medal is the United States Department of Defense's highest non-combat related military award and it is the highest joint service decoration. The Defense Distinguished Service Medal is awarded only while assigned to a joint activity. Normally, such responsibilities deserving of the Defense Distinguished Service Medal are held by the most senior officers such as the Chairman and Vice Chairman of the Joint Chiefs of Staff, the chiefs and vice chiefs of the military services, and commanders and deputy commanders of the Combatant Commands, the Director of the Joint Staff, and others whose duties bring them frequently into direct contact with the Secretary of Defense, the Deputy Secretary of Defense, and other senior government officials. In addition, the medal may also be awarded to other service members whose direct and individual contributions to national security or national defense are recognized as being so exceptional in scope and value as to be equivalent to contributions normally associated with positions encompassing broader responsibilities.

This decoration takes precedence over the Distinguished Service Medals of the services and is not to be awarded to any individual for a period of service for which an Army, Navy, Air Force or Coast Guard Distinguished Service Medal is awarded.

Appearance

The medal is gold in color and on the obverse it features a medium blue enameled pentagon (point up). Superimposed on this is an American bald eagle with wings outspread facing left grasping three crossed arrows in its talons and on its breast is a shield of the United States. The pentagon and eagle are enclosed within a gold pieced circle consisting, in the upper half of 13 five-pointed stars and in the lower half, a wreath of laurel on the left and olive on the right. At the top is a suspender of five graduated gold rays. The reverse of the medal has the inscription "For Distinguished Service" at the top in raised letters, and within the pentagon the inscription "FROM THE SECRETARY OF DEFENSE TO", all in raised letters.

Additional awards of the Defense Distinguished Service Medal are denoted by oak leaf clusters.

Notable recipients

 Jonathan Howe (six awards)
 Lloyd Austin (five awards)
 Wesley Clark (five awards)
 Raymond T. Odierno (five awards)
 Dennis C. Blair (four awards)
 James B. Busey IV (four awards)
 George W. Casey Jr. (four awards)
 William J. Crowe (four awards)
 James L. Jones (four awards)
 Timothy J. Keating (four awards)
 Michael Mullen (four awards)
 Richard Myers (four awards)
 Peter Pace (four awards)
 David Petraeus (four awards)
 Colin Powell (four awards)
 Victor E. Renuart Jr. (four awards)
 John Shalikashvili (four awards)
 Hugh Shelton (four awards)
 John Abizaid (three awards)
 John R. Allen (three awards)
 Peter W. Chiarelli (three awards)
 Vern Clark (three awards)
 James T. Conway (three awards)
 Martin Dempsey (three awards)
 Edmund P. Giambastiani Jr. (three awards)
 Gregory G. Johnson (three awards)
 George Joulwan (three awards)
 William H. McRaven (three awards)
 David M. Rodriguez (three awards)
 Curtis Scaparrotti (three awards)
 Peter Schoomaker (three awards)
 Kurt W. Tidd (three awards)
 Thomas D. Waldhauser (three awards)
 William E. Ward (three awards)
 James A. Winnefeld Jr. (three awards)
 Creighton Abrams (two awards)
 Jeremy M. Boorda (two awards)
 William A. Brown (two awards)
 Bantz J. Craddock (two awards)
 Walter Doran (two awards)
 James O. Ellis (two awards)
 William J. Fallon (two awards)
 Noel Gayler (two awards)
 Andrew Goodpaster (two awards)
 William E. Gortney (two awards)
 Alexander Haig (two awards)
 Harry B. Harris Jr. (two awards)
 Thomas B. Hayward (two awards)
 James L. Holloway III (two awards)
 Jay L. Johnson (two awards)
 Frank B. Kelso II (two awards)
 Joseph D. Kernan (two awards)
 George E. R. Kinnear II (two awards)
 Samuel J. Locklear (two awards)
 Deborah Loewer (two awards)
 Jim Mattis (two awards)
 Stanley A. McChrystal (two awards)
 Mark Milley (two awards)
 Thomas Hinman Moorer (two awards)
 Donald L. Pilling (two awards)
 Joseph Ralston (two awards)
 Bernard W. Rogers (two awards)
 Eric Shinseki (two awards)
 James G. Stavridis (two awards)
 Patricia Ann Tracey (two awards)
 Carlisle A.H. Trost (two awards)
 James D. Watkins (two awards)
 Maurice F. Weisner (two awards)
 Anthony Zinni (two awards)
 J. H. Binford Peay III
 Philip M. Breedlove
 Frank Bowman
 Nancy Elizabeth Brown
 Ronald Burgess (two awards)
 Wendi B. Carpenter
 Bruce W. Clingan
 Robert H. Conn
 Michael P. DeLong
 Leon A. Edney
 Craig S. Faller
 Mark E. Ferguson III
 James R. Fitzgerald
 Mark P. Fitzgerald
 William J. Flanagan Jr.
 Michael Flynn
 Tommy Franks
 Douglas M. Fraser
 John Galvin
 Harold W. Gehman Jr.
 Jonathan W. Greenert
 Cecil D. Haney
 Huntington Hardisty
 John C. Harvey Jr.
 Michelle Howard
 Grace Hopper
 Rick Husband
 Daniel James Jr.
 David E. Jeremiah
 John F. Kelly
 Isaac C. Kidd Jr.
 Charles R. Larson
 Thomas J. Lopez
 Richard C. Macke
 William C. McCool
 Wesley L. McDonald
 Richard W. Mies
 Michael H. Miller
 Carl Epting Mundy Jr. 
 Eric T. Olson
 William A. Owens
 Joseph Prueher
 Dennis Reimer
 Gary Roughead
 Ricardo Sanchez
 Norman Schwarzkopf Jr.
 Leighton W. Smith Jr.
 Vincent R. Stewart
 Harry D. Train II
 Stephen J. Townsend
 Carlisle Trost
 Earle Wheeler
 Charles E. Wilhelm
 Alexander F. Krichevsky
 Robert F. Willard
 Ronald J. Zlatoper
 Bradley A. Heithold
- John Zirkelbach (two awards)

References

External links 
 

Awards and decorations of the United States Department of Defense
Awards established in 1970